An overcoat is a type of long coat intended to be worn as the outermost garment, which usually extends below the knee. Overcoats are most commonly used in winter when warmth is more important.

They are sometimes confused with or referred to as topcoats, which are shorter and end at or above the knees. Topcoats and overcoats together are known as outercoats. Unlike overcoats, topcoats are usually made from lighter weight cloth such as gabardine or covert, while overcoats are made from heavier cloth or fur.

History
In many countries, coats and gowns reaching below the knee have been worn for centuries, often for formal uses, establishing either social status or as part of a professional or military uniform. In the 17th century, the overcoat became widely stylized and available to the different classes.

In the Western world, the general profile of overcoats has remained largely unchanged for a long time. During the Regency, the fashion was to have very form-fitting clothes, with sidebodies, waist seams, and a flared skirt. Examples of this included the frock overcoat and paletot.

Chesterfield coat

The over-frock coat gradually shifted to the looser styles more common now, typified by the Chesterfield coat, which became popular by the end of the Victorian period. Until then, most coats were double-breasted, but Chesterfields and accompanying styles like the guard's coat were worn in both single- and double-breasted varieties.

More recently, there is a decline in the wearing of full-length overcoats, and double-breasted ones are much less common.

Greatcoat

Overcoats in various forms have been used by militaries since at least the late 18th century, and were especially associated with winter campaigns, such as Napoleon's Russian campaign. The full-length overcoat was once again popularised by the use during World War I of the trench coat.

Stereotypically, overcoats used by the army tended to be single-breasted, while navies often used double-breasted overcoats. Overcoats continued to be used as battle dress until the mid-1940s and 1950s, when they were deemed impractical. However, in colder countries, such as the former Soviet Union, they continue to be issued and used. When more efficient clothing and synthetic fibres became readily available, the overcoat began to be phased out even there.

Topcoat

Examples of overcoats 
Some of the most common historical overcoats, in roughly chronological order.

References

Coats (clothing)
History of clothing (Western fashion)